Cecropis is a genus of large swallows found in Africa and tropical Asia. The red-rumped swallow's range also extends into southern Europe, and (in small numbers) into Australia. This genus is frequently subsumed into the larger genus Hirundo.

The swallow family consists of 74 bird species which typically hunt insects in flight. The two river martins have long been recognised as very distinctive, and are placed in a separate subfamily, Pseudochelidoninae, leaving all other swallows and martins in the Hirundininae. DNA studies suggest that there are three major groupings within the Hirundininae subfamily, broadly correlating with the type of nest built.  The groups are the "core martins" including burrowing species like the sand martin, the "nest-adopters", with birds like the tree swallow which use natural cavities, and the "mud nest builders". The Cecropsis species construct a closed mud nest and therefore belong to the latter group. It is believed that the evolutionary sequence is from species that make open cup nests (Hirundo and Ptyonoprogne), through Delichon house martins with closed nests, to Cecropis and Petrochelidon, which have retort-like closed nests with an entrance tunnel.

The genus Cecropis was introduced by the German zoologist Friedrich Boie in 1826. The type species was subsequently designated as the greater striped swallow (Cecropis cucullata) by the Italian zoologist Tommaso Salvadori in 1881. The name of the genus is from the Ancient Greek Kekropis "Athenian woman".

Species
The nine species in the genus are:

References

 
Bird genera